Las Vegas Shakedown is a 1955 American crime film directed by Sidney Salkow from an original screenplay by Steve Fisher. The film stars Dennis O'Keefe, Coleen Gray, and Charles Winninger, and was released on May 15, 1955.

Plot

Cast
 Dennis O'Keefe as Joe Barnes
 Coleen Gray as Julia L. Rae
 Charles Winninger as Ernest Raff
 Thomas Gomez as Al "Gimpy" Sirago
 Dorothy Patrick as Dorothy Reid
 Mary Beth Hughes as Mabel Dooley
 Elizabeth Patterson as Mary Raff
 James Millican as Wheeler Reid
 Robert Armstrong as Doc
 Joseph Downing as Matty
 Lewis Martin as Collins
 Mara McAfee as Angela
 Charles Fredericks as Sheriff Charlie Woods
 Regina Gleason as Maxine Miller
 Murray Alper as House manager
 James Alexander as Sam Costar
 Frank Hanley as Milton Dooley
 Allen Mathews as Rick

References

External links
 
 
 

Allied Artists films
Films directed by Sidney Salkow
1955 crime drama films
1955 films
American crime drama films
1950s English-language films
Films set in the Las Vegas Valley
1950s American films
American black-and-white films